Mohamud Abdullahi Sheikh Siraji (Somali: Maxamuud Cabdulaahi Sheikh Siraaji; Arabic: محمود عبد الله شيخ سراج ) is a Somali politician who was elected from the state of Jubaland as a member of Federal Parliament of Somalia on the 15th of February 2018. Mohamud is the younger brother of the late Minister for Public Works and Reconstruction Abass Abdullahi Sheikh Siraji.

Early life and education 
Born to a religious family, Mohamud spent a great deal of his life living in Dadaab Refugee camps of North Eastern Kenya. At a tender age of 3, Siraji's family moved to Kenya's Dadaab camps via Liboi seeking refuge from the civil war in Somalia.

Born to strict religious parents, Siraji and his siblings have started Qur'anic school (Duksi)  at an early age. It was long before he completed his Qur'anic studies and started learning the Islamic Jurisprudence also known as Fiq.

Mohamud completed both his primary and secondary school in Dadaab, Ifo Refugee camps and later proceeded to Toronto, Canada to Study Bachelor of Commerce at York University.

Siraji was a bright student and has completed at the top of his class both in primary and high school. Because of his high performance in the national exam, he was awarded a scholarship to study his bachelor's degree in Canada.

Politics 
Even though Mohamud joined active politics after the assassination of his late brother, he was actively involved in student organizations and youth advocacy groups. He has been involved in student leadership both in high school and in university. He served in various roles ranging from VP Finance to president in student organization in university.

After the assassination of his late brother, Abass Siraji, he decided to come back and serve his country. After a 9-month wait, he finally won the by-election on landslide on the 15th of Feb 2018.

Committees 
Siraji held assignments on multiple committees e.g. House Committee on Budget, Finance, Planning, and Financial Oversight of Public Institutions, Committee on Food Security and Nutrition, East Africa  Parliamentary  Alliance on Food Security and Nutrition  (EAPA FSN) and  the Ad hoc Committee to complete the Elections Act

House Committee on Budget, Finance, Planning, and Financial Oversight of Public Institutions 
On December 26, 2018, Mohamud Siraji was elected as the chairman of the House Committee on Budget, Finance, Planning, International Cooperation and Financial Oversight of Public Institutions. His election came after the former leadership of the committee has been disbanded after they submitted a controversial financial report that claimed that over $42 million have been lost through corruption. This, however, was later deemed to be incorrect report and the parliament apologized for the wrong report on the missing money.

Committee on Food Security and  Nutrition 
In October 2018, Siraji together with Hon. Abdi Ali attended  The Global Parliamentary Summit against Hunger and Malnutrition held in  Madrid, Spain. In this summit, Siraji gave a moving speech  about the status of food security in his home country of Somalia and pledged to form a parliamentary group that will dedicate to advocating for food security and nutrition in Somalia. On his return to the country, Siraji together with Hon. Ali advocated for the formation of a parliamentary  group dedicated in ensuring that the government allocates resources that will ensure food security and nutrition. In March 2019, Food Security and Nutrition Committee was formed with Siraji being a member.

East Africa Parliamentary  Alliance on Food Security  and Nutrition  (EAPA FSN) 
Following the Madrid meeting, Siraji pledged to form food security committee both in Somalia and the Region. This followed subsequent meetings in Rwanda,  Kenya and Tanzania and the ultimate formation of the East Africa Parliamentary  Alliance on Food Security  and Nutrition  (EAPA FSN) 

This is a regional committee composed of all the East  African countries. Somalia is represented by Hon. Siraji and Hon. Ali. The East Africa Parliamentary  Alliance on Food Security  and Nutrition  (EAPA FSN) is currently chaired by Somalia's Hon. Abdi Ali Hassan

Bills Sponsored 
Mohamud who is the chair of the  Committee on Budget, Finance, Planning and Financial Oversight of Public Institutions, was awarded the best performing member of parliament by  the  speaker on the closing ceremony of the 6th session of the 10th parliament. In just under a year, Siraj tabled over 10 bills that have all been approved by both houses of the parliament. Some of the  bills he sponsored are: Public Financial Management Act (PFM), Customs Act, Statistics Act, Revenue Management Act, Amendments to Procurement Act, The Audit Bill etc.

Public Financial Management (PFM) Act 

Public Financial Management (PFM) Act is one  of the benchmarks that was set for  the government of Somalia in order to qualify for debt relief by the IMF. Siraji who was spearheading the legislative aspect of the SMP debt relief process,  tabled  the PFM act for debating and pushed for it until it was approved by both houses and signed into law by the president on 25th Dec. 2019 

Public financial management (PFM) is critical to basic economic governance and essential in establishing the performance, legitimacy and accountability of functional states.

Public financial management has to do with the effective administration of funds collected and spent by governments. It underlies all government activity and incorporates all components of a country's budget cycle including:

 the mobilisation of revenue
 the allocation of these funds to various activities
 the expenditure and accounting for spent funds

Ineffective public financial management systems hamper development and increase the risk of corruption.

Revenue Management Act 
Just like the PFM act, the Revenue Management Act was  a key  element to  the SMP debt relief  benchmarks set by IMF and the World Bank in order for Somalia to qualify for debt relief. This act was controversial as  all the member states unilaterally rejected it since they have not initially been consulted. This was an opportunity for the young Siraji to shine as he embarked on consultative meetings with the Federal Member states.  This bill was tabled for 2nd and 3rd reading on the 26th of  Oct. 2019 and  within the  course, the bill was as well approved by the upper  house.

On the 27th of Oct. 2019, the president  signed the bill into an act

Statistics Act 

Statistics Act was also an SMP benchmark that the Federal Government of Somalia has to meet  before it can qualify for debt relief under the  IMF/World Bank Highly Indebted Poor Countries (HIPC) initiative.

The Bill was approved on the third  reading by the House of the People (HoP) of theparliament of Somalia on the 28th of  October 2019 and  the  president signed  the  bill into  law.

Role on Debt Relief 
For  Somalia  to qualify the debt relief under the HIPC initiative, it had to do both structural and policy changes. The government of Somalia were required to streamline their  public financial systems so  that they can  be  entrusted with funds. For that to happen, a dozen  number of bills all related to Finance had to be enacted into  a  law.  While the actual decision eventually happened to be March  2020,  the  IMF  and World  Bank initially suggested to  have  the decision point pushed back to  March 2021 because it was almost  impossible to  pass all the necessary bills through the parliament.

Siraji  who  was at the time  the  chairman of the Budget  and Finance Committee took the sole responsibility to fast track the passage of those bills in both houses of the parliament. For a period  of one  year, Siraji  and his committee  tirelessly worked to meet all the benchmark set for the country in order to qualify the  debt relief. As announced by the IMF on their website, Somalia successfully met all the benchmarks and  a such, qualified to receive  a debt relief under  the HIPC process- thanks to Siraji and the team that worked to make this happen.

Deputy Minister of Foreign Affairs & International Cooperation 
On 19th October 2020, Prime Minister Roble announced his new cabinet with Hon. Mohamud Siraji nominated as the deputy minister of Foreign Affairs & International Cooperation. On 24th October, the House of the People of the Federal Republic of Somalia gave the vote of confidence and approved the new cabinet.

References 

1988 births
Living people
Somalian politicians